The Gansu hamster (Cansumys canus) is a species of rodent in the family Cricetidae, endemic to China.  It is the only species in the genus Cansumys.

References

Musser, G. G. and M. D. Carleton. 2005. Superfamily Muroidea. pp. 894–1531 in Mammal Species of the World a Taxonomic and Geographic Reference. D. E. Wilson and D. M. Reeder eds. Johns Hopkins University Press, Baltimore.

Mammals described in 1928
Endemic fauna of China
Hamsters
Rodents of China
Mammals of Asia
Taxonomy articles created by Polbot

They are incredibly endangered animals and could potentially go extinct very soon